McNary is an unincorporated community in Muhlenberg County, in the U.S. state of Kentucky.

History
A post office called McNary Station was established in 1878, the name was shortened to McNary in 1882, and the post office closed in 1937. The community was named for a businessperson in the mining industry.

References

Unincorporated communities in Muhlenberg County, Kentucky
Unincorporated communities in Kentucky